The University of Daugavpils (DU) is a public university in Daugavpils, Latvia, and the largest regional university in the country.

History
The university was founded in 1921 as a teachers’ college. Its director between 1923 and 1940 was Valērija Seile.

Chronology of nomenclature:
 1921–1923 Daugavpils Teachers' Seminary (Daugavpils skolotāju seminārs)  
 1923–1952 Daugavpils State Teachers' Institute (Daugavpils Valsts skolotāju institūts) 
 1952–1993 Daugavpils Pedagogical Institute (Daugavpils Pedagoģiskais institūts) 
 1993–2001 Daugavpils Pedagogical University (Daugavpils Pedagoģiskā Universitāte)

DU received its present name on 13 October 2001. It has become the largest educational institution in Eastern Latvia and is a member of the European University Association and EU²S², the European Union association of universities of small member states. Since 2004 it has benefited from EU Structural Funds for campus expansion and renovation.
 
On 1 March 2018 the Daugavpils Medical College (lv) was integrated into the university as an autonomous institution. The college was established in 1945. 

It is planned to merge the university with the University of Latvia.

Organisation

Faculties and departments
The University consists of five faculties:
Faculty of Humanities
Department of English Philology and Translatology
Department of Russian and Slavic Linguistics
Department of Latvian Literature and Culture 
Department of Latvian Language 
Department of Foreign Languages
Department of History
Faculty of Social Sciences
Department of Economics and Sociology
Department of Social Psychology
 Department of Law
Faculty of Natural Sciences and Mathematics
Department of Information Science
Department of Physics
Department of Mathematics
Department of Chemistry and Geography
Department of Anatomy and Physiology

Faculty of Music and Arts
Department of Music
Faculty of Education and Management
Department of Pedagogy and Pedagogical Psychology
Department of Sport

Institutes and centres
 Centre of Lithuanistics
 Centre of Russian Language and Culture
 Oral History Centre
 Regional German Language and Country Studies Centre for Further Education
 Guntis Liberts Innovative Microscopy Centre
 Institute of Ecology
 Institute of Systematic Biology
 Institute of Art

Daugavpils Medical College
This agency of the university offers study programs in:
Nursing
Physician assistance
Social caregiving
Social rehabilitation 
Nurse assistance
Therapeutic massage

Rectors

The following have served as university rectors/institute directors:
Jānis Jirgens (1921–1922)
Eižens Vietnieks (1922–1923)
 Valērija Seile (1923–1940)
Closed 1940–1944
Leontijs Viškarevs (1944–1946)
Vitālijs Pautovs (1946–1952)
Ivans Petrovs (1952–1953)
Krišs Grašmanis (1953–1958) 
Vitālijs Bauskis (1958–1962)
Anna Kalnbērziņa (1962–1971)
Gunārs Gulbis (1971–1977)
Oļegs Roždestvenskis (1977–1992)
Bruno Jansons (1992–1998)
Jānis Pokulis (1998–2002)
Zaiga Ikere (2002–2007)
Arvīds Barševskis (lv) (2007–2018)
Irēna Kokina (2018–present)

Enrollment

In 2008 more than 4200 students were enrolled in study programs. A large Russian-speaking enrollment and faculty facilitates cooperation with universities outside of the European Union in the CIS.

Students can use Erasmus+ mobility options to study for one or two semesters at European partner universities. Students are able to receive funding from the Else Marie Tschermak Foundation in Denmark to study or conduct research abroad.

Student life is organised through the Students’ Council, the campus newspaper “Lai Top!” (Let it be!), the Latgale Students’ Centre, the Association of Young Scientists of Daugavpils University “DUJZA”, the Art Teacher's Union, the Health Care Centre and Natural Research and Environmental Education Centre. Students can also acquire a foreign language, take part in the students’ dance ensemble “Laima” and utilize a Sport Complex. Interested students have the opportunity to work in the research institutions and centres.

Notable alumni
 Aleksandrs Kudrjašovs – metropolitan of the Latvian Orthodox Church
 Anastasija Grigorjeva – European freestyle wrestling champion and Olympian
 Marjana Ivanova-Jevsejeva – member of the Saeima and member of the board of Olainfarm
 Inese Laizāne – member of the Saeima and director of the Daugavpils Theatre
 Yakov Pliner – member of the Saeima
 Ivans Ribakovs – member of the Saeima
 Valērijs Buhvalovs – member of the Saeima
 Jānis Dukšinskis – member of the Saeima
 Dagnija Staķe – member of the Saeima, Minister of Welfare and Minister of Regional Development of Latvia

Notable academics 
 Joel Veinberg – orientalist and Jewish historian
 Jānis Brikmanis – zoologist

See also
 Ilga Manor

References

External links

 

Universities in Latvia
Educational institutions established in 1921
Daugavpils
1921 establishments in Latvia
Law schools in Latvia